Mary Montagu may refer to:

 Lady Mary Faith Montagu (1911–1983), daughter of the 9th Earl of Sandwich
 Lady Mary Wortley Montagu (1689–1762), English writer
 Mary Montagu, Duchess of Montagu (1689–1751), formerly Lady Mary Churchill, wife of John Montagu, 2nd Duke of Montagu
 Mary Montagu, Countess of Cardigan (c.1711–1775), daughter of the above, wife of George Brudenelllater Montagu, 4th Earl of Cardigan, and later Duchess of Montagu
 Mary Stuart, Countess of Bute (1718–1794), wife of John Stuart, 3rd Earl Stuart